Conor Donovan may refer to:

Conor Donovan (actor) (born 1991), American actor
Conor Donovan (soccer) (born 1996), American soccer player